Governor González may refer to:

Romualdo Palacio González (1827–1907), Governor of Puerto Rico in 1887
Vicente González (governor), Governor of Florida from 1577 to 1578 and Governor of Santa Elena, la Florida, from c. 1577 to 1580